Silvano Mosqueira (September 11, 1875 - August 15, 1954) was a Paraguayan writer.

Selected works
"General Joseph E. Diaz"
"Loose Pages"
"Portraits Paraguayan "
"Ideal"
"Impressions of America"
"Female Silhouettes"
"Juan Silvano Godoi: His Life and Work"
"New Portraits"
"Paraguay"
"American Intellectual Exchange"
"Communism in the Missions"

Paraguayan male writers
1875 births
1954 deaths
Guarani-language writers